= Think Beyond The Label =

- Type: public-private partnership
- Purpose: Disabilities, Employment
- Location: Chicago, Illinois
- Region served: United States
- Method: Advocacy
- Key people: Barbara Otto, president/CEO, Health & Disability Advocates
- Website: http://www.thinkbeyondthelabel.com/

Think Beyond The Label (TBTL) is a public-private partnership that delivers information, outreach and resources to businesses, job seekers and the public workforce system to ensure greater recruiting and hiring opportunities for job candidates with disabilities.

The organization's purpose is to create a more inclusive workforce through informing, connecting and communicating with all stakeholders in the disability and employment systems. TBTL offers a network and digital hub that provides access to qualified job candidates and provide public resources to employers in order recruit relevant talent. TBTL offers a range of business-specific tools that build the case for hiring workers with disabilities. The organization also gives job seekers access to a range of opportunities available to them. These include public employment system resources to private sector job leads, jobs portal pool of candidates actively being sought and the public workforce system.
